HarfBuzz (loose transliteration of Persian calque  harf-bāz, literally "open type") is a software development library for text shaping, which is the process of converting Unicode text to glyph indices and positions. The newer version, New HarfBuzz (2012–), targets various font technologies while the first version, Old HarfBuzz (2006–2012), targeted only OpenType fonts.

History

HarfBuzz evolved from code that was originally part of the FreeType project. It was then developed separately in Qt and Pango. Then it was merged back into a common repository with an MIT license. This was Old HarfBuzz, which is no longer being developed, as the path going forward is New HarfBuzz. In 2013, Behdad Esfahbod won the O’Reilly Open Source Award for his work on HarfBuzz.

Important milestones for new HarfBuzz include:
 0.9.2, Graphite (SIL) support
 1.0 includes Universal Shaping Engine concepts from Microsoft
 1.4 with OpenType font variation support
 1.6 with Unicode 10 support
 1.8 with Unicode 11 support
 2.0 with Apple Advanced Typography (AAT) shaping support.
 2.1 with color fonts support and improved major AAT Shaping features.
 2.4 Unicode 12
 2.6.7 Unicode 13
 3.0 stable API, Unicode 14 support

Users
Most applications don't use HarfBuzz directly, but use a UI toolkit library that integrates with it. HarfBuzz is used by the UI libraries of GNOME (GTK+), KDE (Qt), ChromeOS (Skia), PlayStation 4, Android, Java, and Flutter; and directly by applications Chromium, Firefox, LibreOffice (from version 4.1 on Linux only, from 5.3 on all platforms), Scribus, and Inkscape.

See also

 Graphite (smart font technology) – a programmable Unicode-compliant smart-font technology and rendering system developed by SIL International
 Uniscribe and DirectWrite – two APIs that provide similar functionality on Microsoft Windows platform (HarfBuzz can be used instead of them on Windows also)
 Core Text – an API provides similar functionality on OS X (HarfBuzz can be used instead of it on OS X also)

References

External links
 
 Old Harfbuzz

Digital typography
Free computer libraries
Free software programmed in C
Freedesktop.org
GNOME libraries
Text rendering libraries